The 2018–19 Afghanistan Premier League (also known as Gulbahar Afghanistan Premier League T20 2018) was the first edition of the Afghanistan Premier League Twenty20 (T20) franchise cricket tournament, held in the United Arab Emirates. It took place between 5 and 21 October 2018 at the Sharjah Cricket Stadium.

In September 2018, the Pakistan Cricket Board (PCB) announced that they would not give No Objection Certificates (NOCs) to the active Pakistani players. In October 2018, the Bangladesh Cricket Board (BCB) denied to give NOCs to Mohammad Mithun and Soumya Sarkar.

Balkh Legends won the title, after beating Kabul Zwanan by four wickets in the final.

Squads
The following squads were announced for the tournament:

Points table

The top four teams qualified for the playoffs
 Advanced to Semifinals

League stage

The following fixtures were confirmed in September 2018.

Playoffs
{{4TeamBracket
|RD2=Final

|score-width= 100
|team-width= 220
|seed-width= 20

|RD1-seed1= 1
|RD1-team1= Balkh Legends
|RD1-score1= 235/5 (20 overs)
|RD1-seed2= 4
|RD1-team2= Nangarhar Leopards
|RD1-score2= 64 (13.1 overs)

|RD1-seed3= 2
|RD1-team3= Paktia Panthers
|RD1-score3= 102 (14.5 overs)
|RD1-seed4= 3|RD1-team4= Kabul Zwanan|RD1-score4= 192/9 (20 overs)

|RD2-seed1= 1
|RD2-team1= Balkh Legends
|RD2-score1= 138/6 (18.1 overs)
|RD2-seed2= 3
|RD2-team2= Kabul Zwanan
|RD2-score2= 132/9 (20 overs) 
}}

Semifinal 1

Semifinal 2

Final

Statistics
Most runs

 Last Updated: 22 October 2018.
 Source: Cricinfo

Most wickets

 Last Updated: 22 October 2018.
 Source:''' Cricinfo

References

External links
 Series home at ESPN Cricinfo

Afghanistan Premier League
2018 in Afghan cricket
Afghanistan Premier League